Ratanak International (previously The Ratanak Foundation) is a Christian charity founded by Brian McConaghy in 1989 that works exclusively in Cambodia helping the country rebuild after decades of revolution, civil war and genocide. Ratanak, which means 'precious gem' in Khmer, was an 11-month-old Cambodian baby that Brian McConaghy watched die as a result of a basic lack of medicine in a documentary he was shown in 1989. Since 1990 Ratanak has been working in Cambodia to help prevent such needless deaths. To help rebuild Cambodian society which the Khmer Rouge effectively dismantled in the 1970s, Ratanak has partnered on projects that have built schools, clinics and hospitals, opened orphanages, provided shelters for the elderly and AIDS victims, and initiated emergency programs in response to natural and man made disasters. In 2004, these projects plus many more continued, but the work of Ratanak also took on a whole new dimension as it begin partnering on projects that rescue, rehabilitate and reintegrate children sold into sexual slavery. 

Based on the forensic and investigational experience of its founder, Brian McConaghy, Ratanak has become involved in assisting Canadian Law Enforcement in the investigation of Canadian pedophiles within Cambodia and providing rehabilitation services to their victims.

Ratanak International partners with other NGOs on a large number of development projects in Cambodia, including a variety of programs associated with human trafficking prevention and child/woman abuse recovery. Central to the work in Cambodia is a program whereby victims of sexual abuse and human trafficking are prepared (socially, educationally and emotionally) to re-enter society as healthy adults. For work in this field Ratanak International received the R.L. Petersen Award for Non-Profit Innovation in 2008. 

The Vancouver Police Department and the Royal Canadian Mounted Police have recognized Ratanak International for its assistance in international pedophile investigations.

Ratanak International is a Christian organisation, that is based in Vancouver, British Columbia, Canada, and has sister organizations in the United Kingdom and Australia plus an operations office in Cambodia . 

The Wilberforce Award, named after William Wilberforce, is given by Ratanak International to people who fight human trafficking. Joy Smith, a Conservative Member of Parliament (MP) in Manitoba, received the award in 2010 for making it her priority as an MP to expose the issue of human trafficking. Brian McConaghy founded Ratanak International. McConaghy is a forensic scientist who left the Royal Canadian Mounted Police in order to fight human trafficking. Ride for Refuge has supported Ratanak International.

References

Charities based in Canada
Christianity in Cambodia
Christian organizations based in Canada
Organizations based in Vancouver
Organizations that combat human trafficking
Social welfare parachurch organizations
Human trafficking in Cambodia
Foreign charities operating in Cambodia